Tenue de soirée (also titled Ménage) is a 1986 French comedy-drama film directed by Bertrand Blier. It was entered into the 1986 Cannes Film Festival where Michel Blanc won the award for Best Actor.

Plot
In a dance hall, an ebullient ex-convict named Bob befriends an impecunious young couple, the shrewish Monique and the passive Antoine. He takes them burgling and, while he and Antoine ransack the place for valuables, Monique has a bath and helps herself to clothes and scents. But it becomes apparent that it is Antoine to whom Bob is attracted, while Monique is an also ran. The relationship between the two men develops in unexpected directions.

Cast
 Michel Blanc as Antoine
 Gérard Depardieu as Bob
 Miou-Miou as Monique
 Michel Creton as Pedro
 Jean-Pierre Marielle as the wealthy and depressive man
 Jean-Yves Berteloot as The Male Prostitute
 Bruno Cremer as the art amateur
 Mylène Demongeot as the woman of the couple in bed
 Jean-François Stevenin as the man of the couple in bed
 Dominique Besnehard
 Bernard Farcy

Accolades

References

External links
 
 
 
 

1986 films
1986 comedy-drama films
1980s French-language films
Films directed by Bertrand Blier
French LGBT-related films
Films about prostitution in France
Films scored by Serge Gainsbourg
1986 comedy films
1986 drama films
French comedy-drama films
LGBT-related comedy-drama films
1980s French films